Malappuram (also Malapuram) is a city in the Indian state of Kerala, spread over an area of  including the surrounding suburban areas. The first municipality in the district formed in 1970, Malappuram serves as the administrative headquarters of Malappuram district.
According to the 2011 census, the Malappuram metropolitan area is the fourth largest urban agglomeration in Kerala after Kochi, Calicut, and Thrissur urban areas and the 26th largest in India with a total population of 1.7 million. It is the fastest growing city in the world with a 44.1% urban growth between 2015 and 2020 as per the survey conducted by Economist Intelligence Unit (EIU) based on the urban area growth during January 2020. Malappuram is situated 54 km southeast of Calicut and 90 km northwest of Palakkad. It is the first Indian municipal body to provide free Wi-Fi connectivity to its entire residents. Malappuram is also the first Indian municipal body to achieve the International Organization for Standardization certificate. It is also the first complaint-free municipality in the state.

Etymology
The word Malappuram means "terraced place atop the hills" or simply "hilltop", derived from the general geographical characteristics of the city.

History 

Malappuram was a military and administrative headquarters from ancient times, though several of the ancient history of the city is hardly seen recorded. However, there are some pre-historic relics, particularly Rock-cut caves found in some parts of the city like Oorakam, Melmuri, Ponmala, Vengara etc. manifesting the inhabitancy. Locality named like Valiyangadi, Kootilangadi, Pallipuram etc. points to the Jain - Buddhist history of Malappuram. Notably, the 1500-year-old Jain Temple above 2000 ft sea level at Oorakam Hill of Malappuram undoubtedly proves the same. During the Sangam period, Eranadan Malappuram was under the Chera Empire. Places like Pattar Kadav, Panakkad, etc. are possibly evolved out of Pattars and Panars having lived there. But no further details are available about the life and culture of the people either during the Sangam age or in the post-Sangam age.

Eranad was ruled by a Samanthan Nair clan known as Eradis, similar to the Vellodis of neighbouring Valluvanad and Nedungadis of Nedunganad. The rulers of Eranad were known by the title Eralppad/Eradi. Archaeological relics found in Malappuram also include the remnants of palaces of the eastern branch of the Zamorin reign. Malappuram was the military headquarters of the Zamorin in the Eranad region. The Zamorins held sway over Malappuram and their chieftain Para Nambi, ruled the area in early days with headquarters at Downhill (Kottappadi), Malappuram. Details of the rulers of erstwhile Malappuram, who were the ancestors of later Zamorins, figure in the Jewish copper plates of Bhaskara Ravi Varman (1000 AD) and in the Kottayam copper plates of Veera Raghava Chakravarthy (1225 AD). The later history of the city is interwoven with the history of Zamorin's rule.

During the colonial era, Malappuram was the headquarters of European and British troops and it later became the headquarters of the Malabar Special Police (M.S.P) formerly known as Malappuram Special Force formed in 1885 The British established the Haigh Barracks on top of the hill of Malappuram, at the bank of the Kadalundi river to station their forces, where once Tipu had a fort. Main Barracks has now been turned into the seat of the district administration as Civil Station, Malappuram. Malappuram was the headquarters of one of the five revenue divisions of erstwhile Malabar district, the others being at Thalassery, Kozhikode, Palakkad and Fort Cochin. Apart from the District Board at Calicut, Malappuram Taluk Board were one of the local boards constituted to manage the affairs in Malabar District along with Thalassery, Palakkad and Mananthavady (Wayanad) with jurisdiction corresponding to the divisional charges of the same names. Inscription of the Malappuram Taluk Board can still be seen on the wall of one of the remaining wells constructed in 1916, over 100 years ago at Valiyangadi in the city.
Offices of the Divisional  Revenue Magistrate and Assistant Superintendent of Police of Malabar district were located at Malappuram.

Geography

Topography

Malappuram is situated in the mid land area of the state. As the name suggests, it is covered with small mountains of lush greenery, bonded with several freshwater streams flowing through the city. Kadalundi Puzha, a major river in Kerala is flowing around the city. Malappuram is one of the few municipalities in the state with a tremendous track record of keeping the city clean. The recognition as second 'best municipality in up keeping the cleanliness and health by state government in 2011 and Second prize for Swachhata Excellence Awards in 2019 by Government of India acknowledges these sincere efforts of the municipality. Malappuram is the biggest potential nod of the district. Unlike other district headquarters, Malappuram holds a significant position in west–east transit along with north–south. It makes the city accessible for everyone in the district through either National Highway or State Highway.

Climate
The city has more or less the same climatic conditions prevalent elsewhere in Kerala: a tropical monsoon climate (Köppen Am) that is generally hot and humid in nature. However, the South West Monsoon is usually very heavy. The best season to visit Malappuram is during the months of September to March as the weather conditions are quite pleasant. Owing to its natural habitat, Malappuram is also a city of fresh air. According to the Central Pollution Control Board data for the year 2010, of the 180 cities monitored for SO2, NO2 and PM10, Malappuram was one of the two cities which met the criteria of low pollution (i.e. 50% below the standard) for all air pollutants.

Demographics
According to the 2011 Indian Census, city had a total population of 101,386, of which 48,957 were males and 52,429 were females. The population within the age range of 0 to 6 years was 14,629. The Scheduled Castes and Scheduled Tribes population was 5,323 and 77 respectively. Malappuram had 19785 households in 2011.

Civic administration

Being the headquarters city, Malappuram comprises the Civil Station area which consists of administrative and other Government offices of the district such as District Collectorate, District Treasury, RTO, PWD Division Office, Jilla Panchayat, Town planning Office, Text depot, District Medical office etc. to name a few.
The city is administered by the Malappuram Municipality, headed by a Municipal chairman. For administrative purposes, the city is divided into 40 wards, from which the members of the municipal council are elected for five years. The Chairperson of Malappuram Municipality is C.H. Jameela and the Deputy Chairperson is Perumpally Said. The present Malappuram District Collector is K. Gopalakrishnan.

Malappuram Municipality Election 2015

Law and order
City police are headed by a Dy SP Malappuram. And Office of Superintendent of Police is also at Malappuram. Apart from regular law and order, city police include the Malappuram Traffic Police, Malappuram Vanitha Police Station, which is the only all women station in the district, Crime Branch, Bomb Squad, Dog Squad, Women's Cell, Narcotics Cell, Malabar Special Police, Armed Police Camp, District Crime Records Bureau. Apart from these, there is 24/7 highway police patrol as well as a special pink patrol(Dial-1515) under Malappuram police division catering to women.

Proposed Malappuram Municipal Corporation

Malappuram is the only city in Kerala with a million-plus urban agglomeration that is yet to be upgraded to a Municipal Corporation. However, there is a demand to upgrade the Malappuram Municipality into a Municipal Corporation by incorporating the local bodies in the Greater Malappuram region.
The proposed Malappuram Municipal Corporation comprises:
 Malappuram Municipality
Manjeri Municipality
Anakkayam, a suburban panchayat
Pookkottur, a suburban panchayat
Pulpatta, a suburban panchayat
Morayur, a suburban panchayat
Kodur, a suburban panchayat
Koottilangadi, a suburban panchayat

There are also suggestions to include following Local Bodies in Malappuram Municipal Corporation:
Kottakkal Municipality
Ponmala
Othukkungal
Oorakam 
Kannamangalam 
Parappur 
Vengara 
Makkaraparamba

Education

The city has several educational institutions from the school level to higher education. Kendriya Vidyalaya, Malappuram, Jawahar Navodaya Vidyalaya, Malappuram, Malabar Special Police HSS, Government Girls Higher secondary school, Govt. Boys, St.Gemmas HSS, Islahiya HSS, A.U.P School, Sree Arunodaya Vidya Nigethan etc. to name a few schools. Government College, Malappuram, which is the oldest college in the district started in 1972, College of Applied Science Malappuram started in 1987 and Govt. College for Women, Malappuram started in the year 2015 along with many other private colleges serves the higher educational purpose. Govt.TTI, Malappuram, MCT TTI and Fazfari TTI are few teachers training institutes. MCT College of Legal Studies, one of the two law colleges in the district is located in the city.
The Regional Directorate of Higher Secondary Education and Regional Office (Malabar) of State Open School are located in the city inside the Civil Station.

The district plays a significant role in the higher education sector of the state. It is home to two of the main universities in the state- the University of Calicut centered at Tenhipalam which was established in 1968 as the second university in Kerala, and the Thunchath Ezhuthachan Malayalam University centered at Tirur which was established in the year 2012. AMU Malappuram Campus, one of the three off-campus centres of Aligarh Muslim University (AMU) is situated in Cherukara, which was established by the AMU in 2010. An off-campus of the English and Foreign Languages University functions at Panakkad. The district is also home to a subcentre of Kerala Agricultural University at Thavanur, and a subcentre of Sree Sankaracharya University of Sanskrit at Tirunavaya. The headquarters of Darul Huda Islamic University is at Chemmad, Tirurangadi. INKEL Greens at Malappuram provides an educational zone with the industrial zone. Eranad Knowledge City at Manjeri is a first of its kind project in the state. The MES College of Engineering, Kuttippuram, is the first established engineering college under the self financing sector in Kerala, an urban campus that extends more than a mile (1.6 km) alongside the Bharathappuzha river. The KCAET at Thavanur established in 1963, is the only agricultural engineering institute in the state. The Govt Ayurveda Research Institute for Mental Disease at Pottippara near Kottakkal is the only government Ayurvedic mental hospital in Kerala. It is also the first of its type under the public sector in the country. The Government of Kerala has proposed to establish one more university, the Ayurveda University, at Kottakkal.

The district has the most schools as well as most number of students in Kerala as per the school statistics of 2019–20. There are 898 Lower primary schools, 363 Upper primary schools, Besides these, there are 120 CBSE schools and 3 ICSE schools.

Media

Malayala Manorama, Mathrubhumi, Madhyamam, Chandrika, Deshabhimani, Suprabhaatham dailies have their printing centres in and around the city. The Hindu has an edition and printing press at Malappuram. A few periodicals-monthlies, fortnightlies and weeklies-mostly devoted to religion and culture are also published. Almost all Malayalam channels and newspapers have their bureau at Up Hill. There are some local cable TV channels including (MCV), (ACV) etc. Malappuram Press Club is also situated at UP Hill adjacent to Municipal Town Hall. Doordarshan has its major relay station in the district at Malappuram. Government of India's Prasarbharati National Public Service Broadcaster has FM station in the district, broadcasting on 102.7 Mhtz. Even without any private FM stations, Malappuram finds a place in Top Ten Towns with Highest Radio Listenership in India. There is a multiplex and four standalone cinema halls that screen movies in Malayalam, Tamil, English and Hindi. Rasmi Film Society, one of Kerala's oldest film forums is from Malappuram. The 72nd International film festival of Malappuram was conducted in March 2011. The government of India's Prasar Bharati National Public Service Broadcaster has an FM station in the district (AIR Manjeri FM), broadcasting on 102.7 Mhtz. Even without any private FM stations, Malappuram, Ponnani, and Tirur, find their own places in the ten towns with the highest radio listenership in India.

Sports

Malabar Special Police HSS is one of the best achievers in the Indian inter-school football tournaments. It is also the runner up team of 53rd and 55th Subroto Cup international football tournament held at Delhi. The Kottappadi Football Stadium is located right at the heart of the CBD of Malappuram. The Malappuram District Sports Complex Stadium is situated at Payyanad in Manjeri.  It was selected as one of two stadiums, along with the Jawaharlal Nehru Stadium, to host the group stages of the 2013–14 Indian Federation Cup. The stadium hosted groups B and D.

Notable people

See also 

Administration of Malappuram
Education in Malappuram
History of Malappuram
List of people from Malappuram
Transportation in Malappuram
Malappuram metropolitan area
Malappuram district

References

External links

 Malappuram Municipality

 
Metropolitan cities in India
Cities and towns in Malappuram district
Populated waterside places in India